Dear Basketball is a 2017 American animated film written and narrated by Kobe Bryant and directed and animated by Glen Keane, with music by John Williams. The film is based on a letter Bryant wrote for The Players' Tribune on November 29, 2015, announcing his retirement from basketball.

It was distributed online through go90. The animation, which carries the same name as Kobe's retirement letter, was made in partnership between Bryant's own Granity Studios and Believe Entertainment Group. The short film won the Academy Award for Best Animated Short Film at the 90th Academy Awards, marking the first Oscar win for any professional athlete, as well as the first Oscar win for Keane, a veteran Disney animator.

Production
Keane experimented with new techniques, like animating sweat. He laid a separate sheet over the drawing where a soft layer of graphite was added. By taking pictures with his iPhone and turn it into a negative, where the white turned black and vice versa, so it looked like sweat was running down the face. An eraser was then used to create highlights and reveal the skin underneath.

Plot
On the eve of his retirement from the National Basketball Association (NBA), Kobe Bryant describes his love for the game, which began when he was a young child. The film starts off with Kobe hitting a game-winning dunk as the game clock is running out, and winning the game for the Los Angeles Lakers. He then starts off by saying "Dear Basketball" and goes on to reminisce about his childhood, rolling his father's tube socks and shooting imaginary game-winning shots in the Great Western Forum, falling in love with the game of basketball. The love he had for basketball made him give everything from his mind, body, spirit, and soul to show just how in love with it he was. He then goes on to explain that even as 6-year old boy "I never saw the end of the tunnel, but only saw myself running out of one" and because of this he always chose to play the game as great as he could. He then says "I played for the sweat and the hurt, not because challenge called me, but because you did" and by doing so he was able to achieve his Laker dream. Then he explains how due to the Achilles injury he suffered in 2013, he has only one more NBA season left in him to dedicate to basketball. He says "my heart can take the pounding, my mind can handle the grind, but my body knows it's time to say goodbye." Later, with a heavy heart, he comes to terms with this and accepts the fact that he is ready to let go of basketball. He then tells basketball that he wants to let it know now so they can make the best out of the little precious time they have left together, and remember all the good and bad times they've had together. Finally, he ends the film by claiming "no matter what I do next, I will always be that 6-year-old boy with the rolled up tube socks, garbage bag in the corner, 5 seconds left on the clock, ball in my hands" and continues to depict one of his iconic buzzer-beater shots with the game clock running down. His final words to basketball are "love you always, Kobe."

Reception

Critical reception
, the film holds a 69% approval rating on review aggregator website Rotten Tomatoes, based on 13 reviews with an average rating of 6.6 out of 10.

Accolades

The short was included in The Animation Showcase world touring screening 2018.

Dear Basketball won Best Traditional Animation and Special Jury Award at the 2017 World Animation Celebration International Film Festival held at Sony Pictures Animation. It was shown in Epcot at Walt Disney World in March 2017
.

References

External links

 Believe Entertainment Group official site
 
 

2017 animated films
2017 films
2010s animated short films
Best Animated Short Subject Annie Award winners
Kobe Bryant
Best Animated Short Academy Award winners
Films scored by John Williams
Films directed by Glen Keane
American basketball films
American animated short films
2010s American films
Films about National Basketball Association